Alexander Alexandrovich Popov (born 31 August 1980) is a Russian professional ice hockey forward who currently plays for HC CSKA Moscow of the Kontinental Hockey League (KHL). He previously played his whole professional career for Avangard Omsk, during which time he became a legend and cult figure for fans. He is the all-time scoring leader of Avangard.

After 18 professional seasons with Omsk, Popov opted to leave as a free agent and signed a two-year contract with fellow KHL participants, HC CSKA Moscow, on 25 July 2016.

Career statistics

Regular season and playoffs

International

Awards and honors

References

External links

1980 births
Living people
Avangard Omsk players
HC CSKA Moscow players
HC Khimik Voskresensk players
Ice hockey players at the 2014 Winter Olympics
Olympic ice hockey players of Russia
People from Angarsk
Russian ice hockey left wingers
Sportspeople from Irkutsk Oblast